Darrion Caldwell (born December 19, 1987) is an American mixed martial artist and graduated collegiate wrestler, who currently competes in the bantamweight division of Bellator MMA, where he is the former Bellator Bantamweight World Champion. A professional since 2012, he has also competed for Legacy FC. As a folkstyle wrestler, Caldwell was the 2009 NCAA Division I National Champion, and a two-time All-American at 149 pounds out of the North Carolina State University. He was also a four-time ACC Conference champion.

Wrestling career

High school 
Born and raised in Rahway, New Jersey, Caldwell was an outstanding athlete, lettering in wrestling, football, and baseball at Rahway High School. He was a two-time All-Region football player, but had his most success on the wrestling mats, as he had a record of 148-4 (three losses came as a freshman), and compiled three NJSIAA championships.

University 
Caldwell continued wrestling at North Carolina State University.

2006-07 
As a true freshman, he compiled 20 wins and 6 losses and was named ACC Wrestler of the year and Rookie of the year, as he won the Conference championship and posted an undefeated 9–0 record against ACC competition. Entering the NCAA championships unseeded, he opened up with a fall over the ninth seed and a forfeit over the eight seed, but was subsequently downed by the undefeated top-seed and ultimately eliminated by eventual NCAA champion J. Jaggers, missing All-American status.

2007-08 
As a sophomore, he compiled 36 wins and 5 losses and also won the Cliff Keen Las Vegas Invitational during regular season. Post-season, he won his second straight ACC championship and made it to the semifinals of the NCAA's with a notable win over former NCAA champion Dustin Schlatter. However, he was defeated at the semifinals by the reigning Junior World Champion later turned MMA fighter Bubba Jenkins and by Josh Churella at the consolation semifinals. He ended up placing fifth after winning one more match.

2008-09 
As a junior, he compiled 38 wins and a lone loss that was an injury default, putting on one of the most outstanding seasons in the history of the program. In the post-season, he won his third ACC championship and entered the NCAA's as the third seed. At the tournament, he opened up with two wins over unranked opponents (one of them would go on to become a UFC fighter, Desmond Green) and two more victories over seeded opponents (all four matches with bonus points) to make it to the finale, where he faced the returning Dan Hodge Trophy winner Brent Metcalf. He would end up easily beating Metcalf 11–6 in one of the most iconic matches in NCAA Division I history to claim the championship and earn the Outstanding Wrestler award.

2009-11 
Caldwell was forced to redshirt his next season due to a shoulder injury and came back as a senior in 2010–11. He compiled 15 wins and a lone loss and became a four-time Conference champion before the shoulder injury resurged during his second match at the NCAA's (where he was the top-seed). This forced him to end his collegiate career as an NCAA champion and four-time ACC champion with a record of 109–13.

Freestyle 
Caldwell made his senior freestyle debut at the 2009 US World Team Trials. He ended up placing third at the tournament. He came back in 2012 at the Dave Schultz Memorial, where he did not place. In his final senior freestyle competition, Caldwell competed at the 2012 US Olympic Team Trials Challenge, where he once again did not place and became an MMA fighter shortly after.

After more than eight years since his last freestyle wrestling showdown, Caldwell wrestled '20 Big Ten Conference champion Luke Pletcher on July 25, 2020, at FloWrestling: Dake vs. Chamizo. He lost the bout on points.

Mixed martial arts career

Early career: Legacy Fighting Championship
In July 2012, it was revealed that Caldwell had signed with Texas-based promotion Legacy Fighting Championship.

Caldwell made his MMA and promotional debut against David Armas at Legacy FC 14 on September 14, 2012. For the majority of the fight, Caldwell was able to control the fight on the ground, mounting and taking Armas' back several times. He won via unanimous decision.

In his second professional fight, Caldwell met Quaint Kempf at Legacy FC 16 on December 14, 2012. He won the fight via TKO after dropping Kempf with a left hand and unloading with a series of punches on the ground.

Caldwell next faced Gerzan Chaw at Legacy FC 21 on July 19, 2013. He won the fight via unanimous decision after three rounds.

Bellator MMA

Featherweight
Caldwell signed with Bellator MMA in November 2013.

Caldwell made his debut for the promotion against Lance Surma on March 14, 2014 at Bellator 112. He won via guillotine choke submission at 0:50 in the first round.

In his second appearance for Bellator, Caldwell faced Joe Pingitore at Bellator 118 on May 2, 2014. He won via submission in the first round, improving his record to 5–0.

In his third appearance for the promotion, Caldwell faced Anthony Dizi at Bellator 130 on October 24, 2014. He won the fight via unanimous decision. He later stated in an interview that he plans to move down to the bantamweight division.

Bantamweight
Caldwell made his bantamweight debut against Rafael Silva on May 15, 2015 at Bellator 137. He won the fight by unanimous decision.

Caldwell next faced Shawn Bunch at Bellator 143 on September 25, 2015. He won the fight via submission in the first round.

In his highest profile fight to date, Caldwell faced former two-time Bellator champion Joe Warren in the main event at Bellator 151 on March 4, 2016. Caldwell dominated the fight, winning via technical submission due to a rear-naked choke in the first round.

Caldwell then faced Joe Taimanglo at Bellator 159. He lost the bout via guillotine choke in the third round.

Due to Taimanglo missing weight in their first bout, Caldwell faced Taimanglo in a rematch in the main event at Bellator 167 on December 3, 2016. He won the bout via unanimous decision.

After avenging his first loss, Caldwell was set to face champion Eduardo Dantas for the Bellator bantamweight championship at Bellator 177 on April 14, 2017. An injury, however, forced Caldwell out of the bout. Thus, he was replaced with Bellator newcomer Leandro Higo. Dantas would go on to defeat the latter via split decision in a non-title affair.

The bantamweight title bout against Dantas was rescheduled for Bellator 184 on October 6, 2017. Caldwell won via unanimous decision to become the Bellator Bantamweight Champion.

In the first defense of his title, Caldwell faced Leandro Higo on March 2, 2018 in the main event at Bellator 195. He won the fight via guillotine choke submission in the first round.

Return to Featherweight
In August 2018, Caldwell moved up to featherweight and faced Noad Lahat in a non-title fight at Bellator 204 in Sioux Falls, South Dakota. He won the fight by knockout in the second round.

Rizin FF
Caldwell took part in a Bellator vs. Rizin interpromotional champion vs. champion bout and faced Kyoji Horiguchi for the Rizin Bantamweight Championship at Rizin 14 on December 31, 2018. He lost the fight via submission in the third round

Return to Bellator and losing the Bellator Bantamweight World title
In April 2019, it was announced that Caldwell would make his second Bellator Bantamweight title defense against Kyoji Horiguchi on June 14, 2019 at Bellator 222 in a rematch of their Rizin title bout. Caldwell lost the rematch by unanimous decision.

Bellator Featherweight Grand Prix
On July 15, 2019, Bellator MMA president Scott Coker announced a 16-man Featherweight Grand Prix tournament and announced Caldwell as one of the participants. Caldwell faced Henry Corrales in the opening round of the tournament at Bellator 228 on September 28. He won the fight by unanimous decision.

In the quarterfinals, Caldwell faced Ádám Borics at Bellator 238 on January 25, 2020. He won the bout via first round submission.

In the semifinals, Caldwell was slated to face A. J. McKee at Bellator 244 on June 6, 2020. However, the event was postponed due to the COVID-19 pandemic. The bout was rescheduled and is set to take place on November 19 at Bellator 253. Caldwell was defeated via first round submission.

Return to Bantamweight 
Caldwell made his return to bantamweight against Leandro Higo at Bellator 259 on May 21, 2021. At the weigh-ins, Higo weighed in at 137.5 pounds, one and a half pounds over the bantamweight non-title fight limit. The bout proceeded at catchweight and Higo was fined a percentage of his purse, which went to Caldwell. Caldwell lost the bout via split decision.

Caldwell faced Enrique Barzola on January 29, 2022 at Bellator 273. He lost the bout via ground and pound TKO in the third round.

Caldwell faced Nikita Mikhailov on February 4, 2023 at Bellator 290. Despite dominating in the wrestling and maintaining top control throughout the bout, Caldwell lost the bout via unanimous decision due to not outputting much damage from top.

Celebratory backflip incidents
In the last seconds of his 2009 NCAA championship match against Brent Metcalf, Caldwell attempted to celebrate early with a handspring and backflip. While in the middle of his backflip, Metcalf pushed him, making him fall hard on his back. The push occurred slightly after the whistle. Metcalf later apologized, citing a fight-to-the-end wrestler mentality and frustration.

After defeating Shawn Bunch at Bellator 143 in 2015, Caldwell did a backflip off the cage and landed on a camerawoman, whose shot was live at the time. Though knocked down, she was uninjured, and Caldwell apologized.

Championships and accomplishments

Mixed martial arts 
Bellator MMA
Bellator Bantamweight World Championship (One time)
One successful title defense
Most submission wins in Bellator Bantamweight division history (three)

Folkstyle wrestling 
National Collegiate Athletic Association
NCAA Division I Champion out of North Carolina State University  (2009)
NCAA Division I All-American out of North Carolina State University  (2008, 2009)
NCAA Division I 149 lb - 5th Place out of North Carolina State University (2008)
NCAA Division I 149 lb - 1st Place out of North Carolina State University (2009)
Atlantic Coast Conference
ACC 141 lb Conference Championship out of North Carolina State University  (2007)
ACC 149 lb Conference Championship out of North Carolina State University  (2008, 2009, 2011)

Mixed martial arts record

|-
|Loss
|align=center|15–7
|Nikita Mikhailov
|Decision (unanimous)
|Bellator 290
|
|align=center|3
|align=center|5:00
|Inglewood, California, United States
|
|-
|Loss
|align=center|15–6
|Enrique Barzola
|TKO (punches and elbows)
|Bellator 273
|
|align=center|3
|align=center|3:01
|Phoenix, Arizona, United States
|
|-
|Loss
|align=center|15–5
|Leandro Higo
|Decision (split)
|Bellator 259 
|
|align=center|3
|align=center|5:00
|Uncasville, Connecticut, United States
|
|-
|Loss
|align=center|15–4
|A. J. McKee
|Submission (neck crank)
|Bellator 253
|
|align=center|1
|align=center|1:11
|Uncasville, Connecticut, United States
|
|-
|Win
|align=center|15–3
|Ádám Borics
|Submission (rear-naked choke)
|Bellator 238
|
|align=center|1
|align=center|2:20
|Inglewood, California, United States
|
|-
|Win
|align=center|14–3
|Henry Corrales
|Decision (unanimous)
|Bellator 228
|
|align=center|3
|align=center|5:00
|Inglewood, California, United States
|
|-
|Loss
|align=center|13–3
|Kyoji Horiguchi
|Decision (unanimous)
|Bellator 222
|
|align=center|5
|align=center|5:00
|New York City, New York, United States
|
|-
|Loss
|align=center|13–2
|Kyoji Horiguchi
|Submission (guillotine choke)
|Rizin 14
|
|align=center|3
|align=center|1:12
|Saitama, Japan
|
|-
|Win
|align=center|13–1
|Noad Lahat
|KO (punches)
|Bellator 204
|
|align=center|2
|align=center|2:46
|Sioux Falls, South Dakota, United States
|
|-
|Win
|align=center|12–1
|Leandro Higo
|Submission (guillotine choke)
|Bellator 195
|
|align=center|1
|align=center|2:36
|Thackerville, Oklahoma, United States
|
|-
|Win
|align=center|11–1
|Eduardo Dantas
|Decision (unanimous)
|Bellator 184
|
|align=center|5
|align=center|5:00
|Thackerville, Oklahoma, United States
|
|-
|Win
|align=center|10–1
|Joe Taimanglo
|Decision (unanimous)
|Bellator 167
|  	
|align=center|3
|align=center|5:00
|Thackerville, Oklahoma, United States  	 
|
|-
|Loss
|align=center|9–1
|Joe Taimanglo
|Submission (guillotine choke)
|Bellator 159
|  	
|align=center|3
|align=center|0:09
|Mulvane, Kansas, United States  	 
||
|-
|Win
|align=center|9–0
|Joe Warren
|Technical Submission (rear-naked choke)
|Bellator 151
|  	
|align=center|1
|align=center|3:23
|Thackerville, Oklahoma, United States  	 
|
|-
|Win
|align=center|8–0
|Shawn Bunch
|Submission (rear-naked choke)
|Bellator 143
|
|align=center|1
|align=center|2:35
|Hidalgo, Texas, United States
|
|-
|Win
|align=center|7–0
|Rafael Silva
|Decision (unanimous)
|Bellator 137
|
|align=center|3
|align=center|5:00
|Temecula, California, United States
|
|-
|Win
|align=center|6–0
|Anthony Dizy
|Decision (unanimous)
|Bellator 130
|
|align=center|3
|align=center|5:00
|Mulvane, Kansas, United States
|
|-
|Win
|align=center|5–0
|Joe Pingitore
|Submission (rear-naked choke)
|Bellator 118
|
|align=center|1
|align=center|1:32
|Atlantic City, New Jersey, United States
|
|-
|Win
|align=center|4–0
|Lance Surma
|Submission (guillotine choke)
|Bellator 112
|
|align=center|1
|align=center|0:50
|Hammond, Indiana, United States
|
|-
|Win
|align=center|3–0
|Gerzan Chaw
|Decision (unanimous)
|Legacy FC 21
|
|align=center|3
|align=center|5:00
|Houston, Texas, United States
|
|-
|Win
|align=center|2–0
|Quaint Kempf
|TKO (punches)
|Legacy FC 16
|
|align=center|1
|align=center|1:00
|Dallas, Texas, United States
|
|-
|Win
|align=center|1–0
|David Armas
|Decision (unanimous)
|Legacy FC 14
|
|align=center|3
|align=center|3:00
|Houston, Texas, United States
|

Freestyle record 

! colspan="7"| Senior Freestyle Matches
|-
!  Res.
!  Record
!  Opponent
!  Score
!  Date
!  Event
!  Location
|-
|Loss
|6-6
|align=left| Luke Pletcher
|style="font-size:88%"|2-9
|style="font-size:88%"|July 25, 2020 
|style="font-size:88%"|FloWrestling: Dake vs. Chamizo
|style="text-align:left;font-size:88%;" |
 Austin, Texas
|-
! style=background:white colspan=7 |
|-
|Loss
|6-5
|align=left| Destin McCauley
|style="font-size:88%"|3-3, 1-1
|style="font-size:88%" rowspan=4|March 31 - April 1, 2012
|style="font-size:88%" rowspan=4|2012 US Olympic Team Trials
|style="text-align:left;font-size:88%;" rowspan=4|
 Cedar Falls, Iowa
|-
|Loss
|6-4
|align=left| Jason Tsirtsis
|style="font-size:88%"|0-8, 1-1
|-
|Win
|6-3
|align=left| Jacob Wadley
|style="font-size:88%"|7-1, 8-3
|-
|Win
|5-3
|align=left| Brandon Bradley
|style="font-size:88%"|TF 6–0, 7-0
|-
! style=background:white colspan=7 |
|-
|Loss
|4-3
|align=left| Chase Pami
|style="font-size:88%"|0-3, 0-2
|style="font-size:88%" rowspan=2|February 2–4, 2012
|style="font-size:88%" rowspan=2|2012 Dave Schultz Memorial International
|style="text-align:left;font-size:88%;" rowspan=2|
 Colorado Springs, Colorado
|-
|Win
|4-2
|align=left| Rahul Mann
|style="font-size:88%"|Fall
|-
! style=background:white colspan=7 |
|-
|Loss
|3-2
|align=left| Koba Kakaladze
|style="font-size:88%"|4-2, 2–4, 1-3
|style="font-size:88%" |July 27, 2009
|style="font-size:88%" |2009 Heydar Aliyev Golden Grand Prix
|style="text-align:left;font-size:88%;" |
 Baku, Azerbaijan
|-
! style=background:white colspan=7 |
|-
|Win
|3-1
|align=left| Josh Churella
|style="font-size:88%"|1-0, 4-1
|style="font-size:88%" rowspan=4|May 29–31, 2009
|style="font-size:88%" rowspan=4|2009 US World Team Trials Challenge
|style="text-align:left;font-size:88%;" rowspan=4|
 Council Bluffs, Iowa
|-
|Loss
|2-1
|align=left| Jared Frayer
|style="font-size:88%"|2-2, 2-3
|-
|Win
|2-0
|align=left| Brian Stith
|style="font-size:88%"|1-0, 1-0
|-
|Win
|1-0
|align=left| Doug Schwab
|style="font-size:88%"|1-0, 2-1

NCAA record

! colspan="8"| NCAA Championships Matches
|-
!  Res.
!  Record
!  Opponent
!  Score
!  Date
!  Event
|-
! style=background:white colspan=6 |2011 NCAA Championships at 149 lbs
|-
|Win
|10–4
|align=left|Ivan Lopouchanski
|style="font-size:88%"|MD 18-7
|style="font-size:88%" |March 17–19, 2011
|style="font-size:88%" |2011 NCAA Division I Wrestling Championships
|-
! style=background:white colspan=6 |2009 NCAA Championships  at 149 lbs
|-
|Win
|9–4
|align=left|Brent Metcalf
|style="font-size:88%"|11-6
|style="font-size:88%" rowspan=5|March 19–21, 2009
|style="font-size:88%" rowspan=5|2009 NCAA Division I Wrestling Championships
|-
|Win
|8–4
|align=left|Bryce Saddoris
|style="font-size:88%"|MD 13-2
|-
|Win
|7–4
|align=left|Jake Patacsil
|style="font-size:88%"|MD 10-1
|-
|Win
|6–4
|align=left|Desmond Green
|style="font-size:88%"|MD 10-2
|-
|Win
|5–4
|align=left|Cesar Grajales
|style="font-size:88%"|Fall
|-
! style=background:white colspan=6 |2008 NCAA Championships 5th at 149 lbs
|-
|Loss
|4–4
|align=left|Josh Churella
|style="font-size:88%"|1-6
|style="font-size:88%" rowspan=5|March 20–22, 2008
|style="font-size:88%" rowspan=5|2008 NCAA Division I Wrestling Championships
|-
|Loss
|4–3
|align=left|Bubba Jenkins
|style="font-size:88%"|8-12
|-
|Win
|4–2
|align=left|Dustin Schlatter
|style="font-size:88%"|4-1
|-
|Win
|3–2
|align=left|Brandon Carter
|style="font-size:88%"|Fall
|-
|Win
|2–2
|align=left|Michael Roberts
|style="font-size:88%"|Fall
|-
! style=background:white colspan=6 |2007 NCAA Championships at 141 lbs
|-
|Loss
|1–2
|align=left|J. Jaggers
|style="font-size:88%"|Fall
|style="font-size:88%" rowspan=3|March 15–17, 2007
|style="font-size:88%" rowspan=3|2007 NCAA Division I Wrestling Championships
|-
|Loss
|1–1
|align=left|Ryan Lang
|style="font-size:88%"|Fall
|-
|Win
|1–0
|align=left|Kenneth Hashimoto
|style="font-size:88%"|Fall
|-

See also
 List of current Bellator fighters

References

External links
 
 

1987 births
American male mixed martial artists
Featherweight mixed martial artists
Mixed martial artists utilizing collegiate wrestling
Mixed martial artists utilizing Brazilian jiu-jitsu
Living people
Sportspeople from Rahway, New Jersey
Rahway High School alumni
Bellator male fighters
Bellator MMA champions
American male sport wrestlers
NC State Wolfpack wrestlers
North Carolina State University alumni
Mixed martial artists from New Jersey
American practitioners of Brazilian jiu-jitsu
Native American sportspeople